Ivan Vasilyevich Rukavishnikov (1843–1901) was a Russian mining engineer, gold-miner, one of the co-owners of Lena Gold Mining Partnership, he was the grandfather of the famous writer Vladimir Nabokov.

Biography
Ivan Rukavishnikov was born in Kazan into an Old Believer family.

He graduated from the Physics and Mathematics Faculty of Moscow University and the Faculty of Law of St. Petersburg University.

Awards
He was awarded the Order of Saint Vladimir.

References

Russian mining businesspeople
Old Believers
Vladimir Nabokov
1843 births
1901 deaths
People from Kazan
Businesspeople from Tatarstan